The strong-billed woodcreeper (Xiphocolaptes promeropirhynchus) is a species of bird in the Dendrocolaptinae subfamily. It is one of the largest woodcreepers and the largest furnariids, though the slender long-billed woodcreeper is longer and the great rufous woodcreeper is larger overall. There is some size variation across the range, with typical birds measuring 28–31 cm (11-12.5 in) long and weighing about 120 grams (4.2 oz). Large strong-billed woodcreepers can measure up to 35 cm (14 in) and weigh 169 grams (6 oz). The most distinctive feature of this typically marked striped, brownish bird (other than its size) is its massive, semi-decurved bill, which may be brown or blackish.

The strong-billed woodcreeper is found in Belize, Bolivia, Brazil, Colombia, Costa Rica, Ecuador, El Salvador, Guatemala, Guyana, Honduras, Mexico, Nicaragua, Panama, Peru, and Venezuela. Its natural habitats are subtropical or tropical moist lowland forests and subtropical or tropical moist montane forests. It may be found singly or in pairs, often forging at low levels near the ground and working its way up in trees and accompanying mixed feeding flocks. They are sometimes known to follow antswarms and are usually dominate over other smaller birds also doing this. The strong-billed woodcreeper is listed as Least Concern by the IUCN, with an estimated population between 50,000 and 499,999 mature individuals.

Even among strong-billed woodcreepers in the neotropics, considerable diversity in vocalization has been reported, especially between subgroups separated by the Isthmus of Tehuantepec, a known biogeographical barrier for avifauna along with other organisms. This divide is apparent among X. p. sclateri (located to the north/west of the Isthmus) and X. p. emigrans (located to the south/east of the Isthmus), which also seem to exhibit differences in plumage.

References
The Birds of Ecuador. Robert S. Ridgely & Paul J. Greenfield. Cornell University Press. .

External links

strong-billed woodcreeper
Birds of Central America
Birds of Colombia
Birds of Venezuela
Birds of Ecuador
Birds of the Guianas
Birds of the Amazon Basin
strong-billed woodcreeper
Taxonomy articles created by Polbot